Muhammad Hafiz (born 21 June 1999) is a Malaysian cricketer. In September 2019, he was named in Malaysia's squad for the 2019 Malaysia Cricket World Cup Challenge League A tournament. He made his List A debut for Malaysia, against Denmark, in the Cricket World Cup Challenge League A tournament on 16 September 2019.

References

External links
 

1999 births
Living people
Malaysian cricketers
Place of birth missing (living people)